Aakapa is a small village on Nuku Hiva, in the Marquesas Islands. It lies on Aakapa Bay.

References

Populated places in the Marquesas Islands
Nuku Hiva